Phalanta is a genus of butterflies, called leopards, in the family Nymphalidae. The genus ranges from Africa to northern Australia.

Species
Phalanta alcippe (Stoll, [1782]) – small leopard
Phalanta eurytis (Doubleday, [1847]) – forest leopard, forest leopard fritillary, or African leopard fritillary
Phalanta phalantha (Drury, [1773]) – common leopard or spotted rustic
Phalanta madagascariensis (Mabille, 1887)
Phalanta philiberti (de Joannis, 1893)
Phalanta gomensis (Dufrane, 1945)

External links
"Phalanta Horsfield, [1829]" at Markku Savela's Lepidoptera and Some Other Life Forms
Images representing Phalanta at Consortium for the Barcode of Life

Vagrantini
Nymphalidae genera
Taxa named by Thomas Horsfield